Sin  is a Russian-Italian biographical drama film written and directed by Andrey Konchalovskiy released in October 2019.

Plot 
The film tells about the life of the famous sculptor and painter of the Renaissance, Michelangelo Buonarroti of Florence, in the early 16th century. Michelangelo is a pious and argumentative artist. Although widely considered a genius by his contemporaries, Michelangelo Buonarroti (Alberto Testone) is reduced to poverty and depleted by his struggle to finish the ceiling of the Sistine Chapel. While painting the chapel he is also pressured to simultaneously complete the statues which are part of the tomb designed and intended for Pope Julius II.

When his commissioner and head of the Della Rovere nobility Pope Julius II dies, Michelangelo becomes obsessed with sourcing the finest marble to complete his tomb. The artist's loyalty is tested when Leo X, of the rival Medici family, ascends to the papacy and charges him with a lucrative new commission – the façade of the San Lorenzo basilica. Forced to lie to maintain favour with both families, Michelangelo is progressively tormented by suspicion and hallucinations, leading him to ruthlessly examine his own moral and artistic failings.

Cast
 Alberto Testone as Michelangelo Buonarroti
 Julia Vysotskaya as Lady with an Ermine
 Riccardo Landi as Al Farab
 Jakob Diehl as Peppe
 Antonio Gargiulo as Francesco Maria Della Rovere
 Nicola Adobati as Lorenzo de Medici duca d'Urbino
 Massimo De Francovich as Pope Julius II
 Simone Toffanin as Pope Leo X
 Nicola De Paola as Cardinale Giulio de' Medici
 Adriano Chiaramida as Ludovico Buonarroti
 Glen Blackhall as Raphael
 Orso Maria Guerrini as Marchese Malaspina
 Gianluca Guidi as Egidio da Viterbo
 Federico Vanni as Jacopo Sansovino
 Toni Pandolfo as Dante Alighieri

Reception
Sin has an approval rating of 95% on review aggregator website Rotten Tomatoes, based on 19 reviews, and an average rating of 7.3/10. It also has a score of 65 out of 100 on Metacritic, based on 8 critics, indicating "generally favorable reviews".

See also
Michelangelo in popular culture

References

External links 
 
 

2019 films
Russian biographical drama films
Italian biographical drama films
2010s Italian-language films
Films directed by Andrei Konchalovsky